Paris–Chauny is a one-day cycling race held in France. It was first held in 1922 and has been part of the UCI Europe Tour in category 1.2 since 2015 and 1.1 since 2018.

Winners

References

External links

Cycle races in France
1922 establishments in France
Recurring sporting events established in 1922
UCI Europe Tour races